"Front Line" is a 1983 release written and produced by American R&B singer and songwriter Stevie Wonder, off his greatest hits compilation Stevie Wonder's Original Musiquarium I (1982).

The song is sung from the perspective of a Vietnam War veteran. The protagonist tells the story of how he volunteered to go to Vietnam in 1964 at age sixteen, (suggesting that he was born in 1948, 35 years before the single came out and a couple of years before Wonder's birth) despite being raised to never kill anyone. After losing his leg, he is sent home with a Purple Heart. In the present day, his niece is a prostitute, and his nephew is a drug addict, both of whom insist he has no right to tell them they are wrong in their ways. He reads in the newspaper that another war is on its way, and he remembers the 'many happy families that have been ruined.'

Personnel
Stevie Wonder: vocals, keyboards, drums
Benjamin Bridges: electric guitar
Nathan Watts: bass

Sources
iTunes

Anti-war songs
Songs of the Vietnam War
Songs about Vietnam
Stevie Wonder songs
Songs written by Stevie Wonder
Tamla Records singles
1983 singles
1983 songs
Song recordings produced by Stevie Wonder